Meneage Coastal Section is a coastal Site of Special Scientific Interest (SSSI) in southern Cornwall, England, UK, noted for its geological characteristics.

Geography
It starts at Ponsence Cove in the north, at the discharge point of the Helford River, near St Anthony-in-Meneage village and continues south along the coast of the English Channel to Porthoustock in the south.

The South West Coast Path runs through the SSSI, which also contains two Geological Conservation Review sites. The Lower Fal & Helford Intertidal SSSI overlaps the upper portion of the Meneage Coastal Section.

References

Sites of Special Scientific Interest in Cornwall
Sites of Special Scientific Interest notified in 1994
Meneage